Crambus youngellus, or Young's grass-veneer, is a moth in the family Crambidae. It was described by William D. Kearfott in 1908. It is found in North America, where it has been recorded from north-eastern United States and southern Ontario.

References

Crambini
Moths described in 1908
Moths of North America